Bongiwe Mbinqo-Gigaba is a South African politician. She is the current chairperson of the Portfolio Committee on Basic Education in the National Assembly of South Africa and a Member of Parliament representing the African National Congress. Prior to serving in parliament, she was a Member of the Executive Council (MEC) in the Northern Cape provincial government.

Political career
In the 2009 provincial election, Mbinqo-Gigaba was elected to the Northern Cape Provincial Legislature as a representative of the African National Congress. She was re-elected for a second term in May 2014.

On 1 March 2016, premier Sylvia Lucas appointed her as the Member of the Executive Council (MEC) for the provincial department of Sports, Arts and Culture, succeeding Lebogang Motlhaping. She held this position until 10 May 2017, when Lucas moved her to the public works portfolio. On 1 June 2017, Lucas reversed her decision and Mbinqo-Gigaba was back as MEC for Sports, Arts and Culture. During her tenure in the Northern Cape government, she was the province's youngest MEC. She is also the provincial chairperson of the African National Congress Youth League.

For the 8 May 2019 general election, Mbinqo-Gigaba was a candidate for the National Assembly. She was elected to Parliament at the election and was sworn into office on 22 May 2019, two weeks later. On 2 July 2019, she was elected chairperson of the Portfolio Committee on Basic Education, succeeding Nomalungelo Gina.

References

External links

Ms Bongiwe Pricilla Mbinqo-Gigaba at Parliament of South Africa

Living people
Year of birth missing (living people)
People from the Northern Cape
African National Congress politicians
Members of the National Assembly of South Africa
Women members of the National Assembly of South Africa
Members of the Northern Cape Provincial Legislature
Women members of provincial legislatures of South Africa
21st-century South African politicians